Shefali Sharma is an Indian actress who mainly works in Hindi television and Punjabi films. She made her acting debut in 2013 and is best known for her portrayal of Bani Bhullar in Bani – Ishq Da Kalma, Dr. Ria Maheshwari in Tum Aise Hi Rehna and Amrita Kothari in Sanjog. 

Sharma made her film debut with the Tamil film Sooran (2014) and Punjabi film debut with Toofan Singh (2017).

Personal life
Sharma was born on 28 December 1991 in Amritsar, in a Punjabi family. Sharma married her boyfriend Varun Sethi in 2014.

Career
Sharma made her acting debut in 2013 with Bani – Ishq Da Kalma portraying Bani Parmeet Singh Bhullar/Maya Malhotra opposite Gaurav Chaudhary.

In 2014, she made her film debut with the Tamil film, Sooran. From 2014 to 2015, she portrayed Dr. Riya Agarwal / Dr. Riya Abhimanyu Maheshwari in Tum Aise Hi Rehna opposite Kinshuk Mahajan.

She played Laalima Agarwal in Diya Aur Baati Hum from 2015 to 2016. In 2016, she portrayed Vijaya Akshay Sinha opposite Gaurav Khanna in Tere Bin.

Sharma made her Punjabi film debut with Toofan Singh in 2017. She then made her Telugu film debut in 2018 with Babala Bagotham.

In 2019, she appeared in the Telugu film Subhodayam and the Punjabi film Tu Mera Ki Lagda. 

Sharma made her TV comeback after 6 years with Sanjog in 2022. She portrayed Amrita Rajeev Kothari opposite Rajneesh Duggal.

Filmography

Films

Television

Awards and nominations

References

External links

Living people
Indian television actresses
1987 births